Dr Poo was a radio serial which aired on 2JJ, which was later Triple J, in Sydney, Australia. Over 400 episodes were broadcast in a continuous run from May 1979 to January 1981. It aired as a two-minute segment of Doug Mulray's morning show, at around 7:20 and 8:20 weekdays. It was a Doctor Who parody with an Australian twist.

Background
Dr Poo is a TimeLord from the planet of Galah-Free. The Doctor, his "beautiful but stupid" assistant Dana Sock and Dennis the Denim Cat travel around space and time in the TURDIS (Trans-galactic Urination Regurgitation Defecation Integration System), a portable toilet which is bigger on the inside than the outside.

One of the series' villains was Dr Poo's nemesis Dr Wee — a fellow Time and Toilet Lord with a heavy Chinese accent.

Dr Poo's catchphrases included "Holy Harpic!", "Dunnies above!", "Great bogs in Heaven!", and "Leaping lavatories!" The serial's tagline was "It's all cisterns go, with the amazing man who dares to go anywhere, Doctor Pooo!".

Dr Poo was as much in the debt of The Goons as Doctor Who and also reminiscent of Douglas Adams' Hitchhiker's Guide to the Galaxy.

The voice of the Doctor was Lance Curtis, supported by Geoff Kelso as Kevin the Announcer, Steve Johnston as Dana Sock and Ken Matthews.

In an episode aired in December 1979, Dr Poo announced his intention to take a four-week holiday. Dr Poo was then replaced in its timeslot by The Khan Ages, an 18-episode serial produced by the Dr Poo team. It starred Genghis Khan, his son Neville Khan and their Mongrel Horde, who had been introduced in an earlier Dr Poo storyline. Its tagline was 'Sweeping across the paddocks of history like a grass fire on a windy day come the Khans. This is the saga of their reign of terror: The Khan Ages'. Dr Poo and Dana returned in the last episode of this serial and Dr Poo resumed the following day.

The series was composed of continuous story lines rather than discrete episodes. Every one of more than 400 episodes continued directly into the next, including the Khan Ages storyline. None of the episodes was named; the production team referred to them by number only. An episode guide sent to members of the Dr Poo fan club simply divided the series by each location the TURDIS had landed in.

A comic strip version of Dr Poo appeared in Stir Magazine. Each issue included a self-contained 2-page comic strip. Dr Poo was drawn in Tom Baker's Doctor Who costume.

Album releases
A Dr Poo album, Knees Ahoy! was released in December 1980 on LP and cassette. Episodes which had aired in May 1980 were reworked into six tracks of around six minutes duration. The newly recorded introduction and conclusion dovetailed into each other, so that the album formed an infinite loop if the listener kept changing sides.

An EP, The Universe is Big by "Dr Poo and the Psychic Koalas" was recorded in 1981 but not released. It included five songs based around the major characters of the series. It was eventually released in 1985, as a tribute after the sudden death of Lance Curtis. The title track was later covered on live Doctor Who podcast Splendid Chaps as part of their show at the 2013 Melbourne International Comedy Festival.

References

Sources
Whoniverse site: Dr Poo co uk, 2008
Sawyer, M. There is only one Doctor: Poo, smh.com.au, 2005

Parody radio series
Triple J programs
Australian comedy radio programs
1979 radio programme debuts
1981 radio programme endings